Luke Bell is an Australian triathlete, specializing in long course triathlons, particularly half-ironman and Ironman distance.  Bell was born in Portland, Australia, but currently resides in Melbourne. Bell spends time training in Boulder, Colorado during the Australian winter.

Professional triathlete 
His best results in full-distance Ironman Triathlons include 5th place in Hawaii in 2003 at the relatively young age of 24. He also has second-place finishes at Ironman Australia, Ironman Brazil and Ironman New Zealand.  He has won multiple half-ironman races, including California, Shepparton, and Tasmania.  His former coach is Paul Huddle, husband of Ironman legend Paula Newby-Fraser, and current coach is Matt Dixon from Purple Patch Fitness.

Additional information 
Bell was featured in the Ironman documentary entitled What it Takes, which tracked four triathletes competing for the Ironman World Championships in Kona, Hawaii.  The film also featured fellow triathletes Peter Reid, Heather Fuhr, and Lori Bowden.

References

External links 
 Official website

Australian male triathletes
1979 births
Living people
20th-century Australian people
21st-century Australian people